Moral development focuses on the emergence, change, and understanding of morality from infancy through adulthood.  Morality develops across a life span in a variety of ways and is influenced by an individual's experiences and behavior when faced with moral issues through different periods of physical and cognitive development.  Morality concerns an individual's reforming sense of what is right and wrong;  it is for this reason that young children have different moral judgment and character than that of a grown adult.  Morality in itself is often a synonym for "rightness" or "goodness."  It also refers to a specific code of conduct that is derived from one's culture, religion, or personal philosophy that guides one's actions, behaviors, and thoughts.

Some of the earliest known moral development theories came from philosophers like Confucius, Aristotle and Rousseau, who took a more humanist perspective and Roma  Mia gohthe development of a sense of conscience and virtue.  In the modern-day, empirical research has explored morality through a moral psychology lens by theorists like Sigmund Freud and its relation to cognitive development by theorists like Jean Piaget, Lawrence Kohlberg, B. F. Skinner, Carol Gilligan, and Judith Smetana.

Moral development often emphasizes these four basic fundamentals that was stated inlcude: First, feeling or emotion aspect: these theories emphasize the affective aspect of moral development and include a number of altruism theories. Second, behavioral aspect: these theories mainly deal with moral behavior. Third, Cognitive aspect: these theories focus on moral judgment and moral reasoning. And fourth, Integrated perspectives: a number of theorists have also attempted to propose theories which integrate two or three of the affective, behavioral, and cognitive aspects of morality.

Historical background and foundational theories

Freud: Morality and the Superego

Sigmund Freud, a prominent psychologist who is best known as the founder of psychoanalysis, proposed the existence of a tension between the needs of society and the individual. According to Freud's theory, moral development occurs when an individual's selfish desires are repressed and replaced by the values of critical socializing agents in one's life (for instance, one's parents). In Freud's theory, this process involves the improvement of the ego in balancing the needs and tensions between the id (selfish desires and impulses) and the super-ego (one's internal sense of cultural needs and norms).

B.F. Skinner's Behavioral Theory

A proponent of behaviorism, B.F. Skinner similarly focused on socialization as the primary force behind moral development. In contrast to Freud's notion of a struggle between internal and external forces, Skinner focused on the power of external forces (reinforcement contingencies) in shaping an individual's development. Behaviorism is founded on the belief that people learn from the consequences of their behavior. He called his theory "operant conditioning" when a specific stimulus is reinforced for one to act. Essentially, Skinner believed that all morals were learned behaviors based on the punishments and rewards (either explicit or implicit) that the person had experienced during their life, in the form of trial-and-error behavioral patterns.

Piaget's Theory of Moral Development
While both Freud and Skinner focused on the external forces that bear on morality (parents in the case of Freud, and behavioral contingencies in the case of Skinner), Jean Piaget (1965) focused on the individual's construction, construal, and interpretation of morality from a socio-cognitive and socio-emotional perspective. To understand adult morality, Piaget believed that it was necessary to study how morality manifests in the child's world and the factors that contribute to the emergence of central moral concepts such as welfare, justice, and rights. In interviewing children using the Clinical Interview Method, Piaget (1965) found that young children were focused on authority mandates and that with age, children become autonomous, evaluating actions from a set of independent principles of morality. Piaget characterizes children's morality development through observing children while playing games to see if rules are followed.

Kohlberg: Moral Reasoning

Lawrence Kohlberg proposed a highly influential theory of moral development which was inspired by the works of Jean Piaget and John Dewey. Kohlberg was able to demonstrate through research that humans improved their moral reasoning in 6 specific steps. These stages, which fall into categories of pre-conventional (punishment avoidance and self-interest), conventional (social norms and authority figures), and post-conventional (universal principles),  progress from childhood and throughout adult life. In his research, Kohlberg was more interested in the reasoning behind a person’s answer to a moral dilemma than the given answer itself.

Judgement-Action Gap 

Over forty years, the biggest dilemma that has arisen regarding moral theory is the judgment-action gap. This is also known as the competence performance gap, or the moral-action gap. Kohlberg's theory focused on the stages of moral reasoning by basing it on the competence of an individual working through a moral dilemma. The reason this gap form is due to an error in hypotheticals. When creating a hypothetical dilemma, individuals neglect to include the contingencies of real life constraints. The opposite occurs when an individual is applying their reasoning to a real-life moral dilemma. In this situation instead of leaving out the constraints during their thought process one will include every constraint. Due to this occurrence, a gap forms as a result of creating a position and defending it in a rational manner in response to a situation that requires moral action.

Social Domain Theory
Elliot Turiel  argued for a social domain approach to social cognition, delineating how individuals differentiate moral (fairness, equality, justice), societal (conventions, group functioning, traditions), and psychological (personal, individual prerogative) concepts from early in development throughout the lifespan. Over the past 40 years, research findings have supported this model, demonstrating how children, adolescents, and adults differentiate moral rules from conventional rules, identify the personal domain as a non regulated domain, and evaluate multifaceted (or complex) situations that involve more than one domain. This research has been conducted in a wide range of countries (Argentina, Australia, Brazil, Canada, China, Colombia, Germany, Hong Kong, India, Italy, Japan, Korea, Nigeria, Spain, Switzerland, Turkey, U.K., U.S., Virgin Islands) and with rural and urban children, for low and high income communities, and traditional and modern cultures. Turiel's social domain theory showed that children were actually younger in developing moral standards than past psychologists predicted.

Contemporary developments 
For the past 20 years, researchers have expanded the field of moral development, applying moral judgment, reasoning, and emotion attribution to topics such as prejudice, aggression, theory of mind, emotions, empathy, peer relationships, and parent-child interactions. The Handbook of Moral Development (2006), edited by Melanie Killen and Judith Smetana, provides a wide range of information about these topics covered in moral development today. One of the main objectives was to provide a sense of the current state of the field of moral development.

Cognition and intentionality

A hallmark of moral understanding is intentionality, which can be defined as "an attribution of the target's intentions towards another," or a sense of purpose or directedness towards a certain result. According to researchers Malle, Moses, and Baldwin (2001), five components make up people's concept of intentionality: an action is considered intentional if a personal has (a) a desire for an outcome, (b) a belief that the action will lead to the outcome, (c) an intention to perform the action, (d) skill to perform the action, and (e) awareness while performing it.

Recent research on children's theory of mind (ToM) has focused on when children understand others' intentions The moral concept of one's intentionality develops with experience in the world. Yuill (1984) presented evidence that comprehension of one's intentions plays a role in moral judgment, even in young children. Killen, Mulvey, Richardson, Jampol, and Woodward (2011) present evidence that with developing false belief competence (ToM), children are capable of using information about one's intentions when making moral judgments about the acceptability of acts and punishments, recognizing that accidental transgressors, who do not hold hostile intentions, should not be held accountable for adverse outcomes.

 In this study, children who lacked false belief competence were more likely to attribute blame to an accidental transgressor than children with demonstrated false belief competence. In addition to evidence from a social cognitive perspective, behavioral evidence suggests that even three-year-olds can take into account a person's intention and apply this information when responding to situations. Vaish, Carpenter, and Tomasello (2010), for instance, presented evidence that three-year-olds are more willing to help a neutral or helpful person than a harmful person. Beyond identifying one's intentionality, mental state understanding plays a crucial role in identifying victimization. While obvious distress cues (e.g., crying) allow even three-year-olds to identify victims of harm, it is not until around six years of age that children can appreciate that a person may be an unwilling victim of harm even in the absence of obvious distress. In their study, Shaw and Wainryb (2006) discovered that children older than six interpret compliance, resistance, and subversion to illegitimate requests (e.g., clean my locker) from a victim's perspective. That is, they judge that victims who resist illegitimate requests will feel better than victims who comply.

Emotions

Moral questions tend to be emotionally charged issues that evoke strong affective responses. Consequently, emotions likely play an important role in moral development. However, there is currently little consensus among theorists on how emotions influence moral development. Psychoanalytic theory, founded by Freud, emphasizes the role of guilt in repressing primal drives. Research on prosocial behavior has focused on how emotions motivate individuals to engage in moral or altruistic acts. Social-cognitive development theories have recently begun to examine how emotions influence moral judgments. Intuitionist theorists assert that moral judgments can be reduced to immediate, instinctive emotional responses elicited by moral dilemmas.

Research on socioemotional development and prosocial development has identified several "moral emotions" which are believed to motivate moral behavior and influence moral development. These moral emotions are said to be linked to moral development because they are evidence and reflective of an individual's set of moral values, which must have undergone through the process of internalization in the first place. The manifestation of these moral emotions can occur at two separate timings: either before or after the execution of a moral or immoral act. A moral emotion that precedes an action is referred to as an anticipatory emotion, and amoral emotion that follows an action is referred to as a powerful emotion. The primary emotions consistently linked with moral development are guilt, shame, empathy, and sympathy. Guilt has been defined as "an agitation-based emotion or painful feeling of regret that is aroused when the actor causes, anticipates causing, or is associated with an aversive event". Shame is often used synonymously with guilt, but implies a more passive and dejected response to a perceived wrong. Guilt and shame are considered "self-conscious" emotions because they are of primary importance to an individual's self-evaluation. Moreover, there exists a bigger difference between guilt and shame that goes beyond the type of feelings that they may provoke within an individual. This difference lies in the fact that these two moral emotions do not weigh the same in terms of their impact on moral behaviors. Studies on the effects of guilt and shame on moral behaviors have shown that guilt has a larger ability to dissuade an individual from making immoral choices, whereas shame did not seem to have any deterring effect on immoral behaviors. However, different types of behaviors in different types of populations, under different circumstances, might not generate the same outcomes. In contrast to guilt and shame, empathy and sympathy are considered other-oriented moral emotions. Empathy is commonly defined as an affective response produced by the apprehension or comprehension of another's emotional state, which mirrors the other's affective state. Similarly, sympathy is defined as an emotional response produced by the apprehension or comprehension of another's emotional state which does not mirror the other's effect but instead causes one to express concern or sorrow for the other.

The relation between moral action and moral emotions has been extensively researched. Very young children have been found to express feelings of care, and empathy towards others, showing concerns for others' well-being. Research has consistently demonstrated that when empathy is induced in an individual, he or she is more likely to engage in subsequent prosocial behavior. Additionally, other research has examined emotions of shame and guilt concerning children's empathic and prosocial behavior.

While emotions serve as information for children in their interpretations about moral consequences of acts, the role of emotions in children's moral judgments has only recently been investigated. Some approaches to studying emotions in moral judgments come from the perspective that emotions are automatic intuitions that define morality. Other approaches emphasize the role of emotions as evaluative feedback that help children interpret acts and consequences. Research has shown children attribute different emotional outcomes to actors involved in moral transgressions than those involved in conventional transgressions( Arsenio & Fleiss, 1996). Emotions may help individuals prioritize among different information and possibilities and reduce information processing demands in order to narrow the scope of the reasoning process (Lemerise & Arsenio, 2000). In addition, Malti, Gummerum, Keller, & Buchmann, (2009) found individual differences in how children attribute emotions to victims and victimizers.

Role of interpersonal, intergroup, and cultural influences
Children's interactions and experiences with caregivers and peers have been shown to influence their development of moral understanding and behavior Researchers have addressed the influence of interpersonal interactions on children's moral development from two primary perspectives: Socialization/Internalization) and social domain theory.

Research from the social domain theory perspective focuses on how children actively distinguish moral from conventional behavior based in part on the responses of parents, teachers, and peers. Social domain suggests that there are different areas of reasoning co-existing in development those include societal (concerns about conventions and grouping), moral (fairness, justice and rights) and psychological (concerns with personal goals and identity). Adults tend to respond to children's moral transgressions (e.g., hitting or stealing) by drawing the child's attention to the effect of his or her action on others, and doing so consistently across various contexts. In contrast, adults are more likely to respond to children's conventional misdeeds (e.g., wearing a hat in the classroom, eating spaghetti with fingers) by reminding children about specific rules and doing so only in certain contexts (e.g., at school but not at home). Peers respond mainly to moral but not conventional transgressions and demonstrate emotional distress (e.g., crying or yelling) when they are the victim of moral but unconventional transgressions.

Research from a socialization/internalization perspective focuses on how adults pass down standards or rules of behavior to children through parenting techniques and why children do or do not internalize those values. From this perspective, moral development involves children's increasing compliance with and internalization of adult rules, requests, and standards of behavior. Using these definitions, researchers find that parenting behaviors vary in the extent to which they encourage children's internalization of values and that these effects depend partially on a child's attributes, such as age and temperament. For instance, Kochanska (1997) showed that gentle parental discipline best promotes conscience development in temperamentally fearful children but that parental responsiveness and a mutually responsive parent-child orientation best promote conscience development in temperamentally fearless children. These parental influences exert their effects through multiple pathways, including increasing children's experience of moral emotions (e.g., guilt, empathy) and their self-identification as moral individuals. Development can be divided up to multiple stages however the first few years of development is usually seen to be formed by 5 years of age. According to Freud's research, relationships between a child and parents early on usually provides the basis for personality development as well as the formation of morality.

Researchers interested in intergroup attitudes and behavior related to one moral development have approached the study of stereotypes, prejudice, and discrimination in children and adolescents from several theoretical perspectives. Some, however not limited to are of these theoretical frameworks: Cognitive Development Theory; Social Domain Theory; Social Identity Development Theory Developmental Intergroup Theory Subjective Group Dynamics  Implicit Theories  and Intergroup-contact Theory. The plethora of research approaches is not surprising given the multitude of variables, (e.g., group identity, group status, group threat, group norms, intergroup contact, individual beliefs, and context) that need to be considered when assessing children's intergroup attitudes. While most of this research has investigated two-dimensional relationships between each of the three components: stereotypes, prejudice, and discrimination (e.g., the role of stereotypes in intergroup prejudice, use of stereotypes to reason about intergroup discrimination, how prejudices manifest into discrimination), very few have addressed all three aspects of intergroup attitudes and behaviors together.

In developmental intergroup research, stereotypes are defined as judgments made about an individual's attributes based on group membership. Stereotypes are more complex than regular judgments because they require one to recognize and understand which group an individual belongs to in order to be treated differently deliberately due to their group association. These groups may be defined by gender, race, religion, culture, nationality, and ethnicity. Social psychologists focus on stereotypes as a cognitive component influencing intergroup behaviors and tend to define them as being fixed concepts associated with a category. Prejudice, on the other hand, is defined in terms of negative attitudes or affective expressions toward a whole group or members of a group. Negative stereotypes and prejudices can manifest into discrimination towards an outgroup, and for children and adolescents, this may come in the form of exclusion from peer groups and the wider community (Killen & Rutland, 2011). Such actions can negatively impact a child in the long term in the sense of weakening one's confidence, self-esteem, and personal identity.

One explicit manner in which societies can socialize individuals is through moral education. Solomon and colleagues (1988) present evidence from a study that integrated direct instruction and guided reflection approaches to moral development, with evidence for resultant increases in spontaneous prosocial behavior.

Culture can also be a key contributor toward differences in morality within society. Prosocial behavior, which benefits others, is much more likely in societies with concrete social goals than societies that emphasize the individual. For example, children being raised in China eventually adopt the collective communist ideals of their society. Children learn to lie and deny responsibility for accomplishing something good instead of seeking recognition for their actions. Early indications of prosocial behavior include sharing toys and comforting distressed friends, and these characteristics can be seen in an individual's behavior as young as infancy and toddlerhood. Starting in preschool, sharing, helping, and other prosocial behaviors become more common, particularly in females, although the gender differences in prosocial behavior are not evident in all social contexts.

Moral relativism 
Moral relativism, also called "cultural relativism," suggests that morality is relative to each culture. One cannot rightly pass moral judgment on members of other cultures except by their cultural standards when actions violate a moral principle, which may differ from one's own. Shweder, Mahapatra, and Miller (1987) argued for the notion that different cultures defined the boundaries of morality differently. The term is also different from moral subjectivism, which means that moral truth is relative to the individual. Moral relativism can be identified as a form of moral skepticism and is often misidentified as moral pluralism. It opposes the attitude of moral superiority and ethnocentrism found in moral absolutism and the views of moral universalism. Turiel and Perkins (2004) argued for the universality of morality, focusing mainly on evidence throughout the history of resistance movements that fight for justice by affirming individual self-determination rights. Miller (2006) proposes cultural variability in the priority given to moral considerations (e.g., the importance of prosocial helping). Rather than variability in what individuals consider moral (fairness, justice, rights). Wainryb (2006), in contrast, demonstrates that children in diverse cultures such as the U.S., India, China, Turkey, and Brazil share a pervasive view about upholding fairness and the wrongfulness of inflicting, among others.  Cultures vary in conventions and customs, but not principles of fairness, which appear to emerge very early in development before socialization influences. Wainryb (1991; 1993) shows that many apparent cultural differences in moral judgments are due to different informational assumptions or beliefs about how the world works.  When people hold different beliefs about the effects of actions or the status of different groups, their judgments about the harmfulness or fairness of behaviors often differ, even when they apply the same moral principles.

Religion 
The role of religion in culture may influence a child's moral development and sense of moral identity. Values are transmitted through religion, which is for many inextricably linked to cultural identity. Religious development often goes along with the moral development of the children as it shapes the child's concepts of right and wrong. Intrinsic aspects of religion may have a positive impact on the internalization and the symbolism of moral identity. The child may internalize the parents' morals if a religion is a family activity or the religious social group's morals to which the child belongs. Religious development mirrors the cognitive and moral developmental stages of children. Nucci and Turiel (1993), on the other hand, proposed that the development of morality is distinct from the understanding of religious rules when assessing individuals' reactions to whether moral and nonmoral religious rules was contingent on God's word and whether a harmful act could be justified as morally correct based on God's commands. Children form their understanding of how they see the world, themselves, or others and can understand that not all religious rules are applied to morality, social structures, or different religions.

Moral development in Western and Eastern cultures 
Morality is understood differently across cultures, and this has produced significant disagreement between researchers. According to Jia and Krettenauer, Western concepts of morality can often be considered universal by western researchers, however it is important to consider other viewpoints because such concepts are context-dependent; social expectations vary widely across the globe and even have different understandings of what constitutes as good or just.

Some researchers  have theorized that a person’s moral motivations originate in their “moral identity,” or the extent to which they perceive themselves as moral individuals. However, other researchers believe that this view is limited because it does not account for more collectivistic cultures than individualistic in their societal values. Additionally, “concepts of justice, fairness, and harm to individuals” are emphasized as core elements of morality in Western cultures, whereas “concepts of interdependence, social harmony, and the role of cultural socialization” are emphasized as core elements of morality in Eastern cultures. Studies show that people in Taiwan focused on ethics of community, where people in the United States focused on ethics of autonomy.

Additionally, in an analysis on moral development in adolescents, Hart and Carlo mention that a study found that most (nearly ¾) American Adults held negative views of adolescents. This study mentions that the terms used by these adults “suggested moral shortcomings”, and that only 15% of the adults described adolescents positively. Additionally, the survey results show that the adults believe that adolescent’s biggest problem is the failure to learn and incorporate moral values in life. Although this perceived shortcoming and the implications on society are inaccurate, the perception has made research on moral development more common. Another study in the analysis suggests that those engaging in prosocial behavior as adults were more likely to have engaged in the same behaviors in adolescence. This analysis suggests that one notable aspect found in western cultures is the impact peers have on moral development in adolescence, compared to childhood. Additionally, adolescents tend to experience a lot of outside influence to their moral development compared to in childhood, when parental figures make up the majority of moral exemplars. However, adolescence and childhood lack a distinct separation in stages of moral development, rather adolescence is when moral skills learned in childhood fully develop and become more refined than previously seen.

Cross-cultural ethical principles 
Some researchers  have developed three categories for understanding ethical principles found cross-culturally: ethics of autonomy, ethics of community, and ethics of divinity. Ethics of autonomy (rights, freedom, justice), which are usually emphasized in individualistic/Western cultures, are centered on protecting and promoting individuals’ ability to make decisions based on their personal preferences. Ethics of community (duty, interdependence, and roles), which are usually more emphasized by collectivistic/Eastern cultures (and often corporations), aim to protect the integrity of a given group, such as a family or community. Ethics of divinity (natural order, tradition, purity) aim to protect a person's dignity, character, and spiritual aspects. These three dimensions of understanding form a research tool for studying moral development across cultures that can aid in determining possible universal traits in the lifespan of individuals.

Storytelling in Indigenous American communities

In Indigenous American communities, morality is often taught to children through storytelling. It can provide children with guidelines for understanding the core values of their community, the significance of life, and ideologies of moral character from past generations. Storytelling shapes the minds of young children in these communities and forms the dominant means for understanding and the essential foundation for learning and teaching.

Storytelling in everyday life is used as an indirect form of teaching. Stories embedded with lessons of morals, ideals, and ethics are told alongside daily household chores. Most children in Indigenous American communities develop a sense of keen attention to the details of a story to learn from them and understanding why people do the things they do. The understanding gained from a child's observation of morality and ethics taught through storytelling allows them to participate within their community appropriately.

Specific animals are used as characters to symbolize specific values and views of the culture in the storytelling, where listeners are taught through the actions of these characters. In the Lakota tribe, coyotes are often portrayed as a trickster characters, demonstrating negative behaviors like greed, recklessness, and arrogance  while bears and foxes are usually viewed as wise, noble, and morally upright characters from which children learn to model. In these stories, trickster characters often get into trouble, thus teaching children to avoid exhibiting similar negative behaviors. The reuse of characters calls for a more predictable outcome that children can more easily understand.

Social exclusion

Intergroup exclusion context provides an appropriate platform to investigate the interplay of these three dimensions of intergroup attitudes and behaviors: prejudice, stereotypes, and discrimination. Developmental scientists working from a Social Domain-Theory  perspective have focused on methods that measure children's reasoning about exclusion scenarios. This approach has helped distinguish which concerns children attend to when presented with a situation where exclusion occurs. Exclusion from a peer group could raise concerns about moral issues (e.g., fairness and empathy towards excluded), social-conventional issues (e.g., traditions and social norms set by institutions and groups), and personal issues (e.g., autonomy, individual preferences related to friendships), and these can coexist depending on the context in which the exclusion occurs. In intergroup as well as intergroup contexts, children need to draw on knowledge and attitudes related to their own social identities, other social categories, the social norms associated with these categories as well as moral principles about the welfare of the excluded, and fair treatment, to make judgments about social exclusion. The importance of morality arises when the evaluation process of social exclusion requires one to deal with not only the predisposed tendencies of discrimination, prejudice, stereotypes, and bias but also the internal judgments about justice equality and individual rights, which may prove to be a very complex task since it often evokes conflicts and dilemmas coming from the fact that the components of the first often challenge the components of the latter.

Findings from a Social Domain Theory perspective show that children are sensitive to the context of exclusion and pay attention to different variables when judging or evaluating exclusion. These variables include social categories, the stereotypes associated with them, children's qualifications as defined by prior experience with an activity, personality and behavioral traits that might be disruptive for group functioning, and conformity to conventions as defined by group identity or social consensus. In the absence of information, stereotypes can be used to justify the exclusion of a member of an out-group. One's personality traits and whether he or she conforms to socially accepted behaviors related to identity also provide further criteria for social acceptance and inclusion by peers. Also, research has documented the presence of a transition occurring at the reasoning level behind the criteria of inclusion and exclusion from childhood to adolescence.  Children get older, they become more attuned to issues of group functioning and conventions and weigh them in congruence with issues of fairness and morality.

Allocation of resources

Resource allocation is a critical part of the decision-making process for individuals in public responsibility and authority (e.g., health care providers). When resources become scarce, such as in rural communities experiencing situations when there is not enough food to feed everyone, authorities in a position to make decisions that affect this community can create conflicts on various levels (e.g., personally, financially, socially, etc.). The moral conflict that arises from these decisions can be divided into a focus of conflict and a focus of moral conflict. The locus, or the place where conflict occurs, can develop from multiple sources, which include “any combination of personal, professional, organizational, and community values.  The focus of conflict occurs from competing values held by stakeholders and financial investors. As K. C. Calman  stated in regards to the reallocation of resources in a medical setting, resources must be thought of as money and in the form of skills, time, and faculties.

The healthcare system has many examples where morality and resource allocation has ongoing conflicts. Concerns of morality arise when the initiation, continuation, and withdrawal of intensive care affect a patient well being due to medical decision making. Sox, Higgins, & Owens (2013) offer guidelines and questions for medical practitioners to consider, such as: “How should I interpret new diagnostic information? How do I select the appropriate diagnostic test? How do I choose among several risky treatments?” 
Withholding and withdrawing life-sustaining treatment in the United States have had a moral consensus that there are no differences between these two therapies. However, even though a political decision offers support for medical practitioner's decision making, there continues to be difficulty withdrawing life-sustaining treatments.

See also
 Character education
Happy victimizing
 Justice
 Moral identity
 Religion
 Science of morality
 Social cognitive theory of morality
 Triune ethics theory
 Values education

Further reading
 Metcalfe, Jason; Moulin-Stożek, Daniel (2020). "Religious Education Teachers' Perspectives on Character Education". British Journal of Religious Education. 43 (3): 349–360.

References

External links

 Moral Development article in the Internet Encyclopedia of Philosophy

Developmental psychology
Life skills
Moral psychology